David Quinlan (born 4 January 1978) is a retired Irish rugby player. He played for Blackrock College, Leinster and Northampton, as well as earning two caps for the Irish national team. His position of choice was as an inside centre. He retired due to injury in 2007.

References

Irish rugby union players
Ireland international rugby union players
Blackrock College RFC players
Leinster Rugby players
Northampton Saints players
Living people
1978 births
Rugby union players from Dublin (city)
Ireland international rugby sevens players
People educated at Blackrock College
Expatriate rugby union players in England
Irish expatriate sportspeople in England
Irish expatriate rugby union players